Myrionema is a genus of hydrozoans belonging to the family Eudendriidae.

The species of this genus are found in Caribbean and Malesia.

Species:

Myrionema amboinense 
Myrionema hargitti

References

Eudendriidae
Hydrozoan genera